50th New York Film Critics Circle Awards
January 27, 1985

Best Film:
A Passage to India
The 50th New York Film Critics Circle Awards honored the best filmmaking of 1984. The winners were announced on 18 December 1984 and the awards were given on 27 January 1985.

Winners
Best Actor:
Steve Martin - All of Me
Runner-up: Albert Finney - Under the Volcano
Best Actress:
Peggy Ashcroft - A Passage to India
Runner-up: Vanessa Redgrave - The Bostonians
Best Cinematography:
Chris Menges - The Killing Fields
Best Director:
David Lean - A Passage to India
Runner-up: Bertrand Tavernier - A Sunday in the Country (Un dimanche à la campagne)
Best Documentary:
The Times of Harvey Milk
Best Film:
A Passage to India
Runner-up: The Killing Fields
Best Foreign Language Film:
A Sunday in the Country (Un dimanche à la campagne) • France
Best Screenplay:
Robert Benton - Places in the Heart
Best Supporting Actor:
Ralph Richardson - Greystoke: The Legend of Tarzan, Lord of the Apes
Runner-up: John Malkovich - Places in the Heart
Best Supporting Actress:
Christine Lahti - Swing Shift
Runner-up: Melanie Griffith - Body Double

References

External links
1984 Awards

1984
New York Film Critics Circle Awards, 1984
New York Film Critics Circle Awards
New York Film Critics Circle Awards
New York Film Critics Circle Awards
New York Film Critics Circle Awards